Willie Featherstone (born May 14, 1959) is a Canadian professional super middle/light heavyweight boxer of the 1970s and '80s who won the Canada light heavyweight title, and Commonwealth light heavyweight title, and was a challenger for the World Boxing Association (WBA) World light heavyweight title against Virgil Hill. He lost this fight by TKO in the 10th round "Statistics at boxrec.com". boxrec.com. 31 December 2013. Retrieved 1 January 2013..

References

External links

1959 births
Light-heavyweight boxers
Boxers from Toronto
Super-middleweight boxers
Living people
Canadian male boxers